Changing Horses is the fourth studio album by Ben Kweller, which was expected for release in September 2008 but was eventually released on February 2, 2009 in Europe and February 3, 2009 in the United States. Kweller has described the new album as being more Country in style than his previous releases. The album features his rhythm section Chris Morrissey (bass) and Mark Stepro (drums). It also debuts the talents of Kitt Kitterman, Kweller's manager, who plays pedal steel guitar and Dobro. On November 23, 2008, the full album leaked onto the Internet. In a statement, ATO Records said the leak was not the final version of the album. The song "Hurtin' You" was debuted on Stereogum. The whole album was made available to stream exclusively on Last.fm.

Track listing
 "Gypsy Rose" – 4:56
 "Old Hat" – 4:12
 "Fight" – 2:54
 "Hurtin' You"  – 2:47
 "Ballad of Wendy Baker" – 3:58
 "Sawdust Man" – 4:12
 "Wantin' Her Again" – 2:42
 "Things I Like to Do" – 2:09
 "On Her Own" – 4:01
 "Homeward Bound" – 3:50

Personnel

Musicians
Ben Kweller – lead vocals, guitar, and piano
Kitt Kitterman – pedal steel and dobro
Mark Stepro – drums and backing vocals
Chris Morrissey – bass and backing vocals
"Fight" piano by Riley Osbourn
"On Her Own" electric guitar by Greg Combs
"Hurtin' You" bass/backing vocals by Josh Lattanzi, drums by Ben Kweller, and backing vocals by The Pierces
"Ballad of Wendy Baker" strings by The Tosca String Quartet, arr. by Ben Kweller
"Sawdust Man" claps by Steve Mazur, Rob Niederpruem, and Ben Kweller; percussion by Ben Kweller and Fred Remmert

Production
Produced by Ben Kweller
Recorded by Steve Mazur
Mixed by Ben Kweller and Steve Mazur
Mastered by Fred Kavorkian

Charts

References

Ben Kweller albums
2009 albums
ATO Records albums
Alternative country albums by American artists
The Noise Company albums